Yasmin Raeis is an Egyptian actress, born on 15 September 1985. She started her acting career in a television series called "3ard khas". In addition, she was the main character under the supervision of the movie director Mohamed Khan in a movie called "Factory Girl", a movie that was a big success and won a lot of prizes, both locally and internationally.

Biography
Raeis was born in Egypt to a Palestinian Father and Egyptian mother ، After a successful modeling career, Yasmin Raeis's decision to join the filmmaking industry as an aspiring actress marked a dramatic turn in her life, which paved the way for a more acute turning point when she was unexpectedly selected for her career-defining role in Mohamed Khan's Factory Girl in 2014. Yasmin played the role of a working girl who falls under the spell of love, transcending with this experience class difference to finally stand alone in face of a merciless traditional society that is afraid of love.  Standing out as one of her most indelible performances, Khan predicted that the young Actress's performance will definitely land her a prestigious Best Actress award, later turned out to be true as the young actress received her first Best Actress award at Dubai International Film Festival 2013.

Filmography
 X-large
 Wahed Saheh
 El-Maslaha
 Factory Girl
 Made in Egypt
 Kiss Me Not
 Men Dahr Ragel
 Hepta
 Looking for Oum Kulthum
 The Thief of Baghdad (2020)
 Hazem Khaled Salah eldin

Series
 A'rd Khas
 Lahazat Harega 3
 Taraf Talet
 Moga Harra
 Bedoun Zikr Asma'
 Al Mizan
 Ana shahera ana al khaen
 Mlook El Gdaana

Awards and festivals

Awards
 Best Actress Award from Dubai International Film Festival.
 Best Actress Award from Malmo Arab Film Festival in Sweden.
 Best Actress Award at the 18thEgyptian National Film Festival.
 Best Actress Award at the 41stEgyptian Film Association Festival.
 Best Actress Award at Silk Road Film Festival in Dublin, Ireland.
 A Special Mention from the Jury of Feature Film within the International Oriental Film Festival.

Festivals
 Dubai International Film Festival
 Malmo Arab Film Festival
 Egyptian National Film Festival
 Egyptian Film Association Festival
 International Oriental Film Festival in Geneva
 MEDFilm Festival 
 Sala Women Film Festival 
 Montreal World Film Festival
 ANA Contemporary Arab Cinema Festival
 Twin Cities Arab Film Festival
 Shanghai International Film Festival
 Arab Film Festival in Seoul, Korea
 Kolkata Film Festival
 Safar: A Journey Through Popular Arab Cinema 
 African Film Festival of Verona
 Franco Arab Film Festival
 Carthage Film Festival

References

External links
 

Egyptian film actresses
1985 births
Living people
Egyptian television actresses
Egyptian stage actresses
Egyptian people of Palestinian descent
Malmö Arab Film Festival winners